Coleophora riffelensis is a moth of the family Coleophoridae. It has a fragmented distribution between the Baltic states and central Russia in the north and the Iberian Peninsula and North Macedonia in the south.

The larvae feed on Dianthus lumnitzeri serotinus. Youth cases are 1 mm long and entirely covered by sand grains. Later, they create a trivalved tubular silken case of about 10 mm long. The mouth angle is 35-40°. The colour is light grey with indistinct length lines. Full-grown cases can be found in late June.

References

riffelensis
Moths of Europe
Moths described in 1913